Oktoskop is a weekly TV show aired on Okto, a cable TV channel based in Vienna, Austria. The show focuses on Austrian and international alternative film and documentaries. An in-depth interview with the director of a film is followed by the film itself.

References

2006 Austrian television series debuts
2000s Austrian television series
2010s Austrian television series
Documentary television series
German-language television shows